Tokle is a Norwegian surname. Notable people with the surname include:

Arthur E. Tokle (1922–2005), Norwegian-born American ski jumper and coach
Torger Tokle (1919–1945), Norwegian-born American ski jumper, brother of Arthur

See also
Toke (given name)

Norwegian-language surnames